Atlanta Rhythm Section is the 1972 first album by the American Southern rock band Atlanta Rhythm Section. It was released on the Decca label, DL-75265. It was produced by Buddy Buie.

The album was re-released in 1977 as a double album with Back Up Against the Wall, by the MCA label, MCA-24114.

Track listing

Personnel
Atlanta Rhythm Section
Rodney Justo - vocals
Barry Bailey - acoustic and electric guitars
Dean Daughtry - keyboards
Paul Goddard - bass
Robert Nix - drums, percussion

Production
Arranged by the Atlanta Rhythm Section
Produced by Buddy Buie (for BBC Productions)
Recording and Mix Engineered by Rodney Mills
All songs published by Low-Sal, Inc.

References

Atlanta Rhythm Section albums
1972 debut albums
Albums produced by Buddy Buie